Reinhard Hauff (born 23 May 1939) is a German film director. His works, which were mostly carried out in the late 1960s to early 1990s, are known for their social and political commentary. Stammheim, which is based on the activities of the Red Army Faction (commonly called the Baader-Meinhof Gang) won the Golden Bear award at the 36th Berlin International Film Festival in 1986. In 1987, he was a member of the jury at the 37th Berlin International Film Festival. His 1970 film Mathias Kneissl was entered into the 7th Moscow International Film Festival.

Selected filmography
Director
  (1969, TV film)
 Mathias Kneissl (1970, screenplay by Martin Sperr)
 Haus am Meer (1973, TV film)
 Desaster (1973, TV film)
  (1974)
  (1974, TV film, based on a novel by Franz Josef Degenhardt)
  (1976, TV film)
  (1977)
 Knife in the Head (1978, screenplay by Peter Schneider)
  (1980)
  (1982, based on a story by Peter Schneider)
 Ten Days in Calcutta: A Portrait of Mrinal Sen (1984, Documentary)
 Stammheim (1986, screenplay by Stefan Aust)
  (1988, film version of the musical Linie 1)
  (1989)
 Mit den Clowns kamen die Tränen (1990, TV miniseries, based on a novel by Johannes Mario Simmel)
Actor
 The Sudden Wealth of the Poor People of Kombach (1971), as Heinrich Geiz
 The Enigma of Kaspar Hauser (1974), as a farmer
 Man Under Suspicion (1984), as Holm

References

External links

1939 births
Living people
People from Marburg
Mass media people from Hesse
People from Hesse-Nassau
Members of the Academy of Arts, Berlin
Directors of Golden Bear winners